Jooste is an Afrikaans language surname. Notable people include:

Leon Jooste (born 1969), Namibian politician and businessman
Markus Jooste (born 1961), South African businessman
Nick Jooste (born 1997), Australian Rugby Union player 
Pamela Jooste, South African novelist
Tobi Jooste, South African singer, model, writer and television personality